State to State are a series of albums made by the British electronic music group, 808 State. All three albums include previously unreleased tracks and live version of songs.

State to State 

State to State (also known as Statetostate) is an album that was released only for members of 808 State fan club at the time. The album was reissued in 2021 on Bandcamp.

Track listing 

 "Intro (106 + State To State) / Cubik (Live Tokyo on Air, Jun. 1993*)" – 5:13
 "Yakuza" – 5:43
 "Lemons (Rhythm Device Mix)" – 3:47
 "20:20 (Stormin Norman Sax Mix)" – 2:12
 "La Donna Bionica" – 5:17
 "Repa Repo (Live Wembley November 1992)" – 7:27
 "Diana" – 5:40
 "Fear" – 4:18
 "King Quill" – 4:19
 "Jackson Fraction" – 4:16
 "Control" – 3:20

State to State 2 

State to State 2 was originally released in 2002, for the Video completion of Opti buk. It was later reissue as a standalone version in 2011, and then again in 2021, digitally.

Track listing 

 "Relay" – 5:40
 "Long Orange" – 4:49
 "Kong King" – 6:02
 "The Ten Ten" – 7:21
 "Cassius" – 5:41
 "Hooked" – 4:39
 "Fuzz Nasty" – 5:45
 "Villains And Nerds" – 4:27
 "Quincy's Lunch (PWL Long)" – 7:12*
 "Banacheq (Live)" – 5:04*

* – Appear on reissue only.

State to State 3 

State to State 3 was released in 2011 along side with the previous album, it was later reissued in 2021, digitally.

Track listing 

 "Eastern Standard" – 5:30
 "Atlas 7" – 4:28
 "Kabuki Disco" – 6:44
 "Lemon (Fritz Von Runte Steppah Design)" – 5:26
 "Olympic (Tokyo 1993)" – 5:08
 "Swimperial" – 5:12
 "Argento Nastro" – 5:58
 "Colony (Revisited)" – 5:40
 "Flutronic (Update)" – 4:08
 "Psalm" – 5:04
 "Shellfish" – 5:02
 "Rotator" – 5:47

References 

808 State albums
Electronic albums
2002 albums
2011 albums
1994 albums